Birand Tunca (born 5 October 1990) is a Turkish actor and model.

Born and raised in Istanbul, Tunca became interested in acting and modelling during his high school years. He studied theatre at the Müjdat Gezen Sanat Center Conservatory. Tunca made his debut in 2014 with a role in the historical drama series Diriliş: Ertuğrul. He first became noted for his role in the Aşk Laftan Anlamaz series in 2016. His breakthrough came with a recurring role in the romantic comedy series Erkenci Kuş, in which he portrayed the character of Emre.

Filmography 
Kavak Yelleri (2008) - Ramazan
Diriliş: Ertuğrul (2014) - Bisol 
Yunus Emre (2015–2016)
Aşk Laftan Anlamaz (2016–2017) - Emre 
Mehmetçik Kut'ül Amare (2018)
Erkenci Kuş (2018–2019) - Emre Divit
Aşk Oluversin Gari (2021) - Güney

References

External links 
 
 

1990 births
Turkish male television actors
Turkish male models
Living people
Male actors from Istanbul